Ihor Yakubovsky (born 29 January 1960 in Vilnius) is a former Ukrainian–Soviet professional football player and Ukrainian manager.

Career

Honours
 Soviet Cup winner: 1987–88.

External links
 

1960 births
Living people
Sportspeople from Vilnius
Soviet footballers
Ukrainian footballers
Lithuanian footballers
FK Žalgiris players
FC Metalist Kharkiv players
FC Oleksandriya players
FC Torpedo Zaporizhzhia players
SK Dynamo České Budějovice players
FC Temp Shepetivka players
FC Polissya Zhytomyr players
Soviet Top League players
Ukrainian expatriate footballers
Expatriate footballers in Czechoslovakia
Expatriate footballers in the Czech Republic
Ukrainian expatriate sportspeople in the Czech Republic
Ukrainian Premier League players
Ukrainian First League players
Ukrainian football managers
FC Polissya Zhytomyr managers
Association football midfielders